Boris Ivanovich Gostev (15 September 1927 – 10 August 2015) was a Soviet engineer, economist and politician.

Biography
Gostev was born in 1927. He served an as aide to Prime Minister Nikolai Ryzhkov. He was a deputy under Ryzhkov in the economic department of the Communist Party Central Committee. Gostev was appointed minister of finance on 14 December 1985, replacing long-term finance minister Vasily Garbuzov in the post. Gostev's term ended on 17 July 1989. He died in 2015.

References

External links 
Encyclopedic Reference of Tver Oblast. Entry on Boris Gostev 

1927 births
2015 deaths
Central Committee of the Communist Party of the Soviet Union candidate members
Central Committee of the Communist Party of the Soviet Union members
Tenth convocation members of the Supreme Soviet of the Soviet Union
Eleventh convocation members of the Soviet of the Union
Recipients of the Order of Lenin
Recipients of the Order of the Red Banner of Labour
Soviet Ministers of Finance
Burials in Troyekurovskoye Cemetery